Spring Creek Township is an inactive township in Howell County, in the U.S. state of Missouri.

Spring Creek Township takes its name from a creek of the same name within its borders.

References

Townships in Missouri
Townships in Howell County, Missouri